Otto Martin Olsen (13 December 1884 – 12 July 1953) was a Norwegian rifle shooter who competed in the early 20th century. He won eight Olympic medals including four gold medals. He became the third shooter to win two Olympic individual gold medals and is one of five athletes to have done so at one Olympics.

See also
List of multiple Olympic gold medalists
List of multiple Summer Olympic medalists

References

1884 births
1953 deaths
Norwegian male sport shooters
ISSF rifle shooters
Olympic gold medalists for Norway
Olympic silver medalists for Norway
Olympic bronze medalists for Norway
Olympic shooters of Norway
Shooters at the 1920 Summer Olympics
Shooters at the 1924 Summer Olympics
Olympic medalists in shooting
Medalists at the 1920 Summer Olympics
Medalists at the 1924 Summer Olympics
Sportspeople from Oslo
20th-century Norwegian people